"The Way You Do the Things You Do" is a 1964 hit single by the Temptations for the Gordy (Motown) label. Written by Miracles members Smokey Robinson and Bobby Rogers, the single was the Temptations' first charting single on the Billboard Hot 100, peaking in the Top 20 at number eleven; it also went to number one on the Cash Box R&B chart. The song has been an American Top 40 hit in four successive decades, from the 1960s to the 1990s. A version by Hall & Oates featuring Temptation members Eddie Kendricks and David Ruffin was nominated for a Grammy Award in 1986. A cover version by British reggae band UB40 hit number six in the U.S. in 1990.

Temptations version

Background
Falsetto Eddie Kendricks sings lead on the record, composed by Robinson and Rogers while on the road with the Miracles as part of the Motortown Revue tour. Its plethora of pick-up lines ("You got a smile so bright/you know you coulda been a candle/I'm holding you so tight/You know you coulda been a handle") began as a light-hearted joke between Robinson and Rogers to pass time on the long bus rides. Realizing they had something they could work with, the Miracles kept the lyrics in mind and prepared the song for the Temptations, who at this time had had only one single that had ever made it onto a Billboard chart (1962's "Dream Come True" at number 22 on the R&B singles chart) and six flopped singles. This version of the song actually appears on two of their mid 1960s albums: 1964's Meet The Temptations and 1965's The Temptations Sing Smokey.

The recording was done on January 8, 1964, a mere two weeks after founding Temptation Elbridge Bryant had been fired, and Jimmy Ruffin's younger brother David Ruffin had taken Bryant's place. While Ruffin would sing lead on stage he would remain a background singer on the singles for most of 1964, but after Smokey Robinson heard him sing lead during the Temptations' Motortown Revue performance, Ruffin was assigned to sing lead on what would become the Temptations' first number-one hit, "My Girl".

The Temptations learned about the success of "The Way You Do the Things You Do" after returning home to Detroit, Michigan, and hearing nonchalantly from a Motown executive that "oh, you guys got a hit." After reading the number 76 ("with a bullet") listing in Billboard magazine, Temptations members Otis Williams and David Ruffin immediately began crying with joy. During this period the group's baritone Paul Williams was still considered the main lead singer; but due to the success of this single, Kendricks would be given the lead on the next two following singles.

Personnel
 Lead vocals by Eddie Kendricks
 Background vocals by Melvin Franklin, Paul Williams, David Ruffin, and Otis Williams
 Instrumentation by the Funk Brothers
Bass: James Jamerson
Drums: Richard "Pistol" Allen
Guitar: Eddie Willis
Piano: Earl Van Dyke
Tenor saxophone solo: Henry Cosby

Chart history

Rita Coolidge cover

Rita Coolidge covered "The Way You Do the Things You Do," and it was released in 1978 as the third single from her most successful album, Anytime...Anywhere.  In the U.S., the single reached number 20 on the Billboard Hot 100, number 20 on the Record World Singles Chart and number 18 on the Cash Box Top 100.  It also reached number 16 in Canada.  It is ranked as the 151st biggest Canadian hit of 1978.

Chart performance

Weekly charts

Year-end charts

Other versions
In 1985, a live version (part of a medley with "My Girl") was released by Hall & Oates featuring David Ruffin and Eddie Kendrick, reaching number 20 on the Billboard Hot 100, number 12 on the Adult Contemporary chart, number 40 on the R&B chart, and number 24 on the pop chart. The single was nominated for a Grammy Award.

UB40 cover

"The Way You Do the Things You Do" was covered in 1989 by the band UB40.  It was the sixth single from their 1989 album Labour of Love II. The song was released in 1989 in the majority of European countries (in July 1990 in France), and was featured in the Ridley Scott–Michael Douglas film Black Rain.

Track listings
 7"-Single
 "The Way You Do the Things You Do" (3:03)
 "Splugen" (4:41)

 CD-Single
 "The Way You Do the Things You Do" (3:03)
 "Splugen" (4:41)

 CD-Maxi
 "The Way You Do the Things You Do" (Jazzy Club Mix) (6:11)
 "The Way You Do the Things You Do" (Paradise Mix) (4:07)
 "The Way You Do the Things You Do" (3:00)
 "Splugen" (4:42)

Charts

Certifications

References

External links
 List of cover versions of "The Way You Do the Things You Do" at SecondHandSongs.com

1964 songs
1964 singles
1978 singles
1990 singles
The Temptations songs
The Supremes songs
UB40 songs
Hall & Oates songs
Rita Coolidge songs
Elkie Brooks songs
Songs written by Bobby Rogers
Songs written by Smokey Robinson
Song recordings produced by Smokey Robinson
A&M Records singles
Gordy Records singles
Virgin Records singles